The 2010 CAF Champions League was the 46th edition of Africa's premier club football tournament organized by the Confederation of African Football (CAF), and the 14th edition under the current CAF Champions League format. The winner, TP Mazembe qualified for the 2010 FIFA Club World Cup, and also played in the 2011 CAF Super Cup.

Association team allocation
 Theoretically, up to 55 CAF member associations entered the 2010 CAF Champions League.
 The 12 highest ranked associations according to CAF 5-Year Ranking were eligible to enter 2 teams in the competition. For this year's competition, CAF used 2004-08 5-Year ranking. As a result, a maximum of 67 teams entered the tournament - although this level has never been reached.

Below is the qualification scheme for the competition. Nations are shown according to their CAF 5-Year Ranking - those with a ranking score have their rank and score indicated:

Unranked associations have no ranking points and hence are equal 20th.
Bolded clubs received a bye in the preliminary round, entering the tournament in the first round.

1 Hearts of Oak, the champion of Ghana, did not enter the competition, citing financial problems.
2 A position was included for a representative of the association at the time of the draw, but the association eventually withdrew without sending a team.

Schedule

Qualifying rounds

Preliminary round

|}

Byes: Al Ahly (Egypt), 
Al-Hilal Omdurman (Sudan),
ASEC Mimosas (Ivory Coast), 
Dynamos (Zimbabwe),
Heartland (Nigeria), TP Mazembe (Congo DR), Africa Sports National (Ivory Coast, drawn against champions of Benin, but the Beninese FA did not send a team) and US Douala (Cameroon, drawn against the champions of São Tomé and Príncipe, but the São Tomé and Príncipe FA did not send a team).

First round

|}

Second round

|}

 The losing teams from the second round advance to the 2010 CAF Confederation Cup play-off round.

Group stage

Group A

Group B

Knock-out stage

Bracket

Semifinals

|}

Final

Top goalscorers 
The top scorers from the 2008 CAF Champions League are as follows:

See also
 2010 CAF Confederation Cup
 2011 CAF Super Cup

References

External links
Fixtures of the qualifying rounds of the 14th Orange CAF Champions League
Fixtures & results
Groups & standings

 
CAF Champions League seasons
1